Capparidastrum is a genus of flowering plants in the caperbush family Capparaceae, native to Latin America and the Caribbean. Some authorities have it as a synonym of Morisonia or Capparis.

Species
Species currently accepted by The Plant List are as follows: 
Capparidastrum bonifazianum (Cornejo & Iltis) Cornejo & Iltis
Capparidastrum brasilianum  (DC.) Hutch.
Capparidastrum coimbranum  (Cornejo & Iltis) Cornejo & Iltis
Capparidastrum cuatrecasanum  (Dugand) Cornejo & Iltis
Capparidastrum discolor  (Donn.Sm.) Cornejo & Iltis
Capparidastrum elegans  (Mart.) Hutch.
Capparidastrum frondosum  (Jacq.) Cornejo & Iltis
Capparidastrum grandiflorum  Cornejo & Iltis
Capparidastrum huberi  Iltis & Cornejo
Capparidastrum humile  (Hassl.) Cornejo & Iltis
Capparidastrum macrophyllum  (Kunth) Hutch.
Capparidastrum megalospermum  Cornejo & Iltis
Capparidastrum mollicellum  (Standl.) Cornejo & Iltis
Capparidastrum osmanthum  (Diels) Cornejo & Iltis
Capparidastrum pachaca  (Kunth) Hutch.
Capparidastrum petiolare  (Kunth) Hutch.
Capparidastrum quinum  (J.F.Macbr.) Cornejo & Iltis
Capparidastrum quiriguense  (Standl.) Cornejo & Iltis
Capparidastrum sola  (J.F.Macbr.) Cornejo & Iltis
Capparidastrum sprucei  (Eichler) Hutch.
Capparidastrum tenuisiliquum  (Jacq.) Hutch.
Capparidastrum tuxtlense  Cornejo & Iltis

References

Capparaceae
Brassicales genera